Hengameh Ghaziani (born 20 May 1970) is an Iranian actress and translator. She has received various accolades, including two Crystal Simorgh, a Hafez Award and an Iran Cinema Celebration Award.

She got arrested by the Iranian government in November 2022 during Mahsa Amini protests for publicly supporting the protesters.

Biography 
Hengameh Ghaziani was born on 20 May 1970 in Mashhad, Iran.

She has a BA in Human-Economic Geography from Islamic Azad University in Mashhad and Shahre-Rey, and has also studied Western Philosophy at San Francisco University.

Her acting career began in 2000 when she was cast in the movie Twilight, directed by Hassan Hedayt. Her first appearance on the theatre stage was in the play Like blood for steak which was produced by Leev theatre group.

Ghaziani translated Wilcomb E. Washburn's Red Man's Land/White Man's Law, a history book about the status of Native American. In 2015 she started a band with herself as the singer, which performed in Vahdat Hall.

She has received two Crystal Simorgh awards for Best Actress at the Fajr International Film Festival, in 2007 for As Simple as That and in 2011 for Days of Life.

Hijab arrest

Ghaziani and Katayoun Riahi were arrested in November 2022 for "provocative" social media posts and media activity. Both actresses had expressed solidarity with the protest movement and removed their headscarves in public.

Awards

As a Film Critic/ Jury Member

Filmography 
The Accomplice (2020)
Hangovering Time (2018)
Ordakly (2018)
One Canary One Crow (2017)
My Brother, Khosro (2016)
Delbari (2016)
Rabidity (2015)
The Other One's Dad (2015)
Ginkgo: Suspended Narrative (2015)
Saken Tabaghe Vasat (2014)
With Others (2014)
Welcome to Tehran (2014)
The Wedlock (2014)
Annunciation to a Third Millennium Citizen (2013)
I am a Mother (2012)
Migren (2012)
Days of Life (2012)
Barf Rooye Shirvani Dagh (2011)
Felicity Land (2011)
Facing Mirrors (2011)
Bidari-e Royaha (2010)
Niloofar (2008)
As Simple as That (2008)
Ravayat haye na tamam (2007)
Saye Roshan (2001)

References

External links

1970 births
Living people
People from Mashhad
People from Tehran
Iranian translators
Mahsa Amini protests
Iranian film actresses
Iranian stage actresses
Political prisoners in Iran
21st-century Iranian actresses
Islamic Azad University alumni
21st-century Iranian women singers
University of San Francisco alumni
Crystal Simorgh for Best Actress winners